Muslim Mubarak Almas (born 13 June 1985 in Basra, Iraq) is an Iraqi footballer currently playing for Baghdad club Al-Difaa Al-Madani. He was part of Iraq B team in the 2007 King's Cup.

Career
For several years the forward that been touted as starter for the national side after his displays for Al-Zawraa and the Under-19s, however coach after coach have overlooked the dazzling frontman for the national side. Has won the league title at three clubs, in 2006 with Al-Zawraa in which he dispatched the winning penalty, with Arbil FC in 2008 and with Al Shorta in 2013.

Honors

Clubs
Al-Zawraa
 Iraqi Premier League: 2005–06
Erbil
 Iraqi Premier League: 2007–08, 2008–09, 2011–12
Al-Shorta
 Iraqi Premier League: 2012–13

Country
Iraq Police
 Arab Police Championship: 2002

External links
 
 Muslim Mubarak on Goalzz

Iraqi footballers
Iraqi expatriate footballers
Iraq international footballers
Sportspeople from Basra
Al-Mina'a SC players
Al-Zawraa SC players
Rah Ahan players
Expatriate footballers in Iran
Erbil SC players
Living people
1985 births
Al-Shorta SC players
Association football forwards